The S series is a three-cylinder gasoline engine developed and manufactured by Honda, with a total displacement of 656 cc. The engine is intended for kei car applications and replaced the earlier Honda P engine when it first appeared in November 2011.

S07

S07A (Earth Dreams)
PGM-FI DOHC 12 Valve
Displacement: 656 cc
Bore & stroke: 64.0 mm × 68.2 mm
Compression ratio: 11.2:1
Power:  / 7,300 rpm
Torque:  / 3,500 rpm
Applications:
Honda N-One
Honda N-Box

S07A Turbo (Earth Dreams)

PGM-FI DOHC 12 Valve
Turbocharger
Displacement: 656 cc
Bore & stroke: 64.0 mm × 68.2 mm
Compression ratio: 9.5:1
Power:  / 6,000 rpm
Torque:  / 2,600 rpm
Applications:
Honda S660 (2015–2022)
Honda N-One
Honda N-Box

External links

S